Cirrhimuraena paucidens is an eel in the family Ophichthidae (worm/snake eels). It was described by Albert William Herre and George S. Myers in 1931. It is a subtropical, marine eel which is known from the western central Pacific Ocean.

References

Ophichthidae
Taxa named by Albert William Herre
Taxa named by George S. Myers
Fish described in 1931